Tomáš Karpov (born 9 March 1989) is a Czech professional ice hockey player who played for National Ice Hockey League team Basingstoke Bison. He played with HC Sparta Praha in the Czech Extraliga during the 2010–11 Czech Extraliga season. He moved to England to play with Telford Tigers in the 2012-13 EPIHL before joining up with the Bison. Between 2013-2016 Bison won all three EPIHL trophies (EPL Champion, EPL Play-Offs and EPL Cup). The contract with the Basingstoke Bison expired after 2016-2017 season.

References

External links

1989 births
Czech ice hockey forwards
HC Sparta Praha players
Living people
People from Benešov
Sportspeople from the Central Bohemian Region
HC Berounští Medvědi players
Telford Tigers players
Basingstoke Bison players
LHK Jestřábi Prostějov players
Calgary Hitmen players
Moose Jaw Warriors players
Czech expatriate ice hockey players in Canada
Expatriate ice hockey players in England
Czech expatriate sportspeople in England
Stadion Hradec Králové players